Duster is an American slowcore band consisting of multi-instrumentalists Clay Parton, Canaan Dove Amber, and Jason Albertini from San Jose, California.

History
Formed in 1996 with only Parton and Amber who had previously worked together in bands Mohinder and Calm, they released 2 cassettes in the same year titled On the Dodge and Christmas Dust, respectively, as well as a 7" titled Transmission, Flux on Up Records released in 1997. Later the next year, Jason Albertini joined the band as a drummer and played on three tracks for their debut album, 1998's Stratosphere, and with 1999's 1975 EP, Albertini became much more involved in the group's process, playing many more instruments and sharing recording/producing credits with Parton and Amber.  By 2000's Contemporary Movement, he was fully involved in the creative process as a permanent member of the group.

On April 13, 2018, Duster posted via their Instagram page that they are "recording a little bit". Later it was announced that the band's discography would be reissued as the box set Capsule Losing Contact through The Numero Group, which was released on March 22, 2019. On July 4, 2019, the band released their first standalone single in almost 20 years, "Interstellar Tunnel", and subsequently announced their third self-titled studio album, which was released on December 13 that year.

Of their hiatus and subsequent reunion, Parton said, "When we took a break almost two decades ago, we didn't think it was going to all completely stop. We thought we could keep it drifting at least, maybe at a slower pace and with a different process. But everything just went dark. We were always in touch and sometimes we'd talk about doing Duster things, but days just piled up... In recent years we've talked more seriously about at least doing another record. Now everything is sort of working out, and we are making new things together, but we're taking it slow and still doing most things wrong, so it does feel like right where we left off."

On March 31, 2022, the band surprise-released their fourth studio album Together through several music videos on YouTube, with the album becoming available for sale the following day. Following the release, Parton announced that Albertini had left Duster to focus on his indie rock project Helvetia, although Albertini stated in the liner notes of the Bandcamp release of his 2023 album, You shot up past the moon scapegoat, that it was more complicated and his departure was due to mental health.

Side projects
The band released 2 albums under the pseudonym Valium Aggelein which were later re-released as a box set in 2020. Parton has also released music under the pseudonyms Eiafuawn (Everything is all fucked up and what not) and the Soviets and has played in bands El Buzzard, Breasts, Parton Kooper Planetarium, Two Boys Alright, Stumpy and Ghost Drugs. Albertini has his own band Helvetia that has put out multiple records on Parton's record label The Static Cult Label and has played for Mike Johnson, Built to Spill and Xiu Xiu. Amber has also released an EP under his name and Lonnie Win.

Musical style
Generally seen as indie rock, the group has been also associated with the space rock revival and slowcore movements by critics due to their unique sound. To produce this, the band typically recorded on cheap and older recording equipment, such as cassette decks, in their Low Earth Orbit studio, which is not an actual place but rather the general name where the band works, giving their music a lo-fi quality.

Members
 Clay Parton - instruments, production (1996-2001, 2018–present)
 Canaan Dove Amber - instruments, production (1996-2001, 2018–present)
 Jason Albertini - drums, production (1998-2001, 2018-2022)

Discography

Studio albums
 Stratosphere (1998)
 Contemporary Movement (2000)
 Duster (2019)
 Together (2022)

EPs
 Transmission, Flux (1997)
 Apex, Trance-Like (1998)
 1975 (1999)

Box sets
 Capsule Losing Contact (2019)
 Black Moon (as Valium Aggelein) (2020)

Limited releases
 On the Dodge (1996)
 Christmas Dust (1996)
 Dweller on the Threshold (as Valium Aggelein) (1997)
 Hier kommt der schwartze mond (as Valium Aggelein) (1998)

SoundCloud-exclusive releases
 Experimental Dust (2000) (2018)
 On the Air (live KSCU radio set, 1997; released 2019)
 Test Phase, Tape One (1997) (2019)
 Rarities (2001) (2019)

Singles
 "What You're Doing to Me" (2019)
 "Copernicus Crater" (2019)
 "Letting Go" (2019)
 "What Are You Waiting For" (2022)

Videos
 "Me and the Birds" (2003, Up Records)
 "Interstellar Tunnel" (2019)
 "Copernicus Crater" (2019)
 "Lomo" (2019)
 "Isolation Sounds" (2020)
 "Drifter" (2022)
 "Escalator" (2022)
 "Feel No Joy" (2022)
 "Making Room" (2022)
 "Sad Boys" (2022)
 "New Directions" (2022)

Compilation appearances
 Up in Orbit! (1997)
 Up Next (1998)
 Zum Audio, Vol. 2 (1998)

References

External links
 Up Records Duster artist page
 The Static Cult Label
 Skylab Operations
 Numero Group Duster Page

Indie rock musical groups from California
Musical groups from San Jose, California
Sadcore and slowcore groups